Mohammed Rashid Mohammed Iqbal Kamaal, better known as Kamaal Rashid Khan (born 1 January 1975; often referred to as KRK or Kamaal R Khan), is an Indian actor, producer and writer in Hindi and Bhojpuri cinema. He has produced or written most of the films he has starred in, notably the controversial Deshdrohi (2008), his only film as a lead actor. He is best known for his supporting role in Ek Villain (2014) and for participating in the reality show Bigg Boss in 2009. He has also appeared in music videos.

Biography 
Khan was born in a Muslim family in Deoband, a town in the Saharanpur district of Uttar Pradesh, India in 1975. He is the father of two kids, a son and a daughter. A businessman, he ventured into the Indian film industry during the 2000s.

He started out as a producer and writer for films and has also appeared in supporting roles therein, these include the Hindi romance-drama Sitam (2005) directed by Partho Ghosh, the Bhojpuri films Tu Hamaar Hou (2006) directed by Jayprakkash Shaw, Munna Pandey Berozgaar (2007) directed by Manish Jain; romance and comedy films respectively.

Desh Drohi (2008), a crime-thriller, was his first film as a leading actor and dealt with organised crime in India and like his previous ventures was also written and produced by him. It received negative reviews from critics and was banned by the Maharashtra state government amid riot concerns for depicting the 2008 attacks on Uttar Pradeshi and Bihari migrants in Maharashtra, which was eventually lifted by the Bombay High Court.

His next was Jimmy (2008) directed by Raj N. Sippy, another crime film written and produced by Khan. He is best known for his supporting role in the film Ek Villain (The Villain; 2014), where he played the role of the titular serial killer's best friend, notably neither produced nor written by him. At the 2015 Ghanta Awards (humorous Bollywood film awards), Khan was awarded the Worst Supporting Actor for Ek Villain.

He also appeared in the third season of the reality show Bigg Boss, the Indian version of Big Brother, in 2009; he later appeared in the stand-up comedy show, Comedy Nights Bachao in 2015. Besides films and television, he has also starred in music videos including "Tum Meri Ho" (2019) sung by Javed Ali, which he also produced and wrote the lyrics for.

He has since shifted to the profession of a YouTuber, posting film reviews and box office analysis. These videos, which often target Indian celebrities, have attracted controversy. Carry Minati, another Indian YouTuber, roasted Khan in a 2016 video "KRK India's Best Film Actor/Producer/Critic". Mika Singh, an Indian singer, released a diss track against Khan, "#krkkutta: Barking Dog - Mika Singh" in 2021.

He was a candidate in the 2014 Indian general election for the Lok Sabha (lower house of the Indian Parliament) from the Samajwadi Party. He quit the party citing differences with Samajwadi Party leader Abu Azmi's son Farhan Azmi and contested as an independent politician but did not win. He also has business interests in Dubai.

Kamal R Khan has been at the centre of controversies since 2005. Courts in Mumbai granted injunctions to restrict Khan from posting defamatory content against actor Salman Khan and producers Nikhil Dwivedi and Vashu Bhagnani in separate cases in 2021. He was arrested and detained in 2022 by the Mumbai Police, when returning from Dubai where he had been residing, for complaints (filed by Yuva Sena politician Rahul Kanal) on his 2020 tweets against Akshay Kumar-starrer Laxmii, a 2020 LGBT film dealing with transgender issues (hijras), and tweets against director Ram Gopal Varma. After spending nine days in judicial custody, he was granted bail for the tweets and for a separate 2021 sexual molestation complaint filed by model Taashaa Hayaat.

Filmography

Feature films

Television

Music videos

Notes

References

External links
 
 
 
 
 
 

Living people
1975 births
Male actors in Hindi cinema
Indian male film actors
Film producers from Uttar Pradesh
Indian male screenwriters
Indian lyricists
Participants in Indian reality television series
People from Deoband
People from Dubai
Indian expatriates in the United Arab Emirates
Candidates in the 2014 Indian general election
Bigg Boss (Hindi TV series) contestants
Samajwadi Party politicians
Male actors in Bhojpuri cinema
Hindi film producers
Hindi screenwriters
YouTube critics and reviewers
Indian YouTubers